The 2010 California State Controller election was held on November 2, 2010, to choose the State Controller of California. The primary election was held on June 8, 2010. Incumbent John Chiang won reelection.

Candidates 
The following were certified by the California Secretary of State as candidates in the primary election for State Controller. Candidates who won their respective primaries and qualified for the general election are shown in bold.

American Independent 
 Lawrence Beliz, businessman
 Nathan Johnson

Democratic 
 John Chiang, incumbent State Controller

Green 
 Ross D. Frankel, accountant

Libertarian 
 Andrew "Andy" Favor, certified public accountant

Peace and Freedom 
 Karen Martinez

Republican 
 David Evans, certified public accountant
 Tony Strickland, state senator and nominee in 2006

Primary results

American Independent

Republican

Others

General results

References

External links

Official campaign Web sites 
Lawrence Beliz
John Chiang
Andy Favor
Ross Frankel
Tony Strickland

State Controller
California State Controller elections
November 2010 events in the United States
California